Wilburton railway station was a station in Wilburton, Cambridgeshire on the Ely and St Ives Railway. It was closed to regular passenger trains in 1931, excursion trains in 1958, and completely in 1964 along with the rest of the route.

The station featured a single platform, a signal box and a goods shed/granary on a loop.

References

Sources

External links
 Wilburton station on navigable 1946 O. S. map
 Wilburton Station on 'Disused Stations'

Former Great Eastern Railway stations
Disused railway stations in Cambridgeshire
Railway stations in Great Britain opened in 1866
Railway stations in Great Britain closed in 1931